Jong Myong-chol (born 11 March 1978) is a North Korean long-distance runner who specializes in the marathon. His personal best time is 2:14:58 hours, achieved at the 2005 Pyongyang Marathon.

He competed in the 2004 Olympic marathon. He also finished seventh in the half marathon at the 2003 Summer Universiade, and won the 2003 Pyongyang Marathon.

Achievements

References

1978 births
Living people
North Korean male marathon runners
Athletes (track and field) at the 2004 Summer Olympics
Olympic athletes of North Korea
North Korean male long-distance runners